The second edition of the Pan Pacific Swimming Championships, a long course (50 m) event, was held in 1987 at the Chandler Aquatic Centre in Brisbane, Australia, from August 13–16.

Results

Men's events

Legend:

Women's events

References

External links
 Results on GBRAthletics.com

Pan Pacific Swimming Championships
Swimming competitions in Australia
International aquatics competitions hosted by Australia
Pan Pacific
Sports competitions in Brisbane
1987 in Australian sport